Tai tou is a typographical East Asian expression of honor that can be divided into two forms, Nuo tai and Ping tai.

Nuo tai

Nuo tai (literally "move and shift") is a typographical device used in written Chinese to denote respect for the person being mentioned. It leaves a full-width (1 character wide) space before the first character of the person; it can be represented as Unicode character . This is also sometimes still used in Taiwan for important officials, such as Chiang Kai-shek and Sun Yat-sen, although this practice has gradually fallen out of favor.

Examples
(reading left to right)
國父　孫中山先生 - Father of the Nation (space) Mr. Sun Yat-sen
先總統　蔣公 - The Late President (space) Honorable Chiang
起初　神創造天地 - In the beginning (space) God created the heaven and the earth.

Ping tai
Ping tai (literally "level shift") is another form. The way to express the respect is to shift the name of person directly to the head of the next line. This is now considered old-fashioned, and when it was used it was usually seen in documents sent between emperor and ministers when the minister mentioned the emperor.

Dan tai
Dan tai (literally ''single shift") is an archaic form where the shifted phrase is moved to a new line and begins one character above a normal line.  Traditionally, this is used when the recipient of the letter is addressed.

Shuang tai

Shuang tai (literally "double shift") as above, but two characters above a normal line.  This is used to denote respect for the recipient's parents and other elders.  In official texts, this is used when the words emperor (帝) and empress (后) appear.

San tai
San tai (literally "triple shift") as above, but three characters above a normal line; since Chinese writers customarily leave a margin of two characters for tai tou from the paper border, a san tai would require the first character to appear outside of the page borders.  Such a practise is used for characters denoting the divine, such as Heaven, Earth, and deceased ancestors (天, 地 and 祖宗).

References

Chinese honorifics
Chinese literature
Typography
Punctuation